Hydroelectricity in Romania is the second most important source of electricity generation in Romania, after the fossil fuels.

See also
List of dams and reservoirs in Romania
Energy in Romania
Solar power in Romania
Wind power in Romania
Geothermal power in Romania
Renewable energy by country

References

 
Renewable energy in Romania